Liberation Front of Andalusia (in Spanish: Frente de Liberación de Andalucía) was an independentist and socialist party in Andalusia, Spain.

History 
FLA was founded in 1978 by the Cordobés documentarist and ex-member of the Communist Party of Spain (PCE) Antonio Medina Molera. The party was also a result of the union of several splinter factions of various left movements; like the Unified Socialist Party of Andalusia (PSUA) or the Nationalist Left of Andalusia. In Catalonia the party had good relations with the Socialist Party of National Liberation (PSAN), and even gave support to the Left Bloc for National Liberation (BEAN) in the Catalan parliamentary elections of 1980.

FLA disappeared in 1980, and the majority of its members joined the Yama'a Islámica de Al-Andalus and, later, Andalusian Liberation. These new organizations wanted not only independence for Andalusia, but also to reclaim the Islamic legacy of Al Andalus.

References

Andalusian nationalist parties
Defunct socialist parties in Spain
Defunct nationalist parties in Spain
Left-wing nationalist parties
Political parties in Andalusia
Pro-independence parties
Secessionist organizations in Europe